Mark I. McCarthy  is the Robert Turner Professor of Diabetic Medicine at the University of Oxford, where he is also a senior research fellow of Green Templeton College. He is recognized for his research on the genetic basis of type II diabetes.

References

External links
Faculty profile

British diabetologists
Living people
British medical researchers
British geneticists
Academics of the University of Oxford
Fellows of the Academy of Medical Sciences (United Kingdom)
Fellows of the Royal College of Physicians
Fellows of the Royal Society of Biology
Human geneticists
Fellows of Green Templeton College, Oxford
Year of birth missing (living people)